Uvaṭa was a commentator of the Vedas. He wrote commentaries of the prātiśākhyas, notably on the Rigveda-pratishakhya of Shaunaka. 

According to Bhimasena's Sudhasagara-tika, he was a brother of Kaiyata, the author of Mahabhaṣyapradipa, and of Rajanka Mammata,  and lived at the court of Bhoja, in the mid eleventh century.

References

See also
Sayana
Mahidhara

Vedas
Bhoja